Edward N. Costikyan (September 24, 1924June 22, 2012) was an Armenian American Democratic Party politician who was notable for reforming the party in New York City. He was also the author of many books and articles on varied topics of public policy and political science.

Early life and education
Costikyan was born in Weehawken, New Jersey on September 24, 1924. By 1940, he and his family (father, Mihran Nazar Costikyan; mother, Berthe Muller Costikyan; and older brother Andrew M. Costikyan) had moved to West 122nd Street in the Morningside Heights neighborhood of Manhattan. His father was an oriental rug dealer of Armenian descent while his mother was a native of Switzerland. He graduated from Horace Mann School, where his mother taught, and served in World War II. He graduated from Columbia University in 1947, and Columbia Law School in 1949.  He clerked for a year for Judge Harold R. Medina at the U.S. District Court.

Career
In 1951 he joined the firm of Paul, Weiss, Rifkind, Wharton & Garrison, in his first position as an associate lawyer.  He became a partner of that firm in 1960. In 1962, Costikyan was elected chairman of the New York County Democratic Committee, defeating Carmine DeSapio, and served two years.  He was credited for removing Tammany Hall influence, thus reforming the Democratic Party and bringing it into the 20th Century. He was Abraham Beame's campaign manager in the 1965 Mayoral campaign.  He served on commissions investigating the New York City government for Governor Nelson A. Rockefeller and Mario M. Cuomo. He dropped out of his campaign for Mayor in 1977, but instead joined the campaign of Edward I. Koch, formerly a political adversary. For many years until his death, he served as a member of the advisory board for the Center for New York City Law at New York Law School.

Personal life
Costikyan has been married twice. His first marriage to Frances Holmgren ended in divorce. In 1977, he married Barbara Heine, a freelance writer and daughter of advertising executive, Arthur C. Fatt in a Unitarian ceremony. He has two children from his first marriage including game designer Greg Costikyan. He was a founder and conductor for the Occasional Oratorio and Orchestral Society.

Coskityan died on June 22, 2012, at the age of 87, at his daughter's home in Mount Pleasant, South Carolina.

Partial bibliography
Costikyan was the author of many works on the law, public policy, and political science, including:

Books
 Edward N. Costikyan, Behind closed doors: politics in the public interest (Harcourt Brace 1966).
 Edward N. Costikyan, New Strategies for Regional Cooperation; a Model for the Tri-State New York-New Jersey-Connecticut Area (1973) 
 Edward N. Costikyan, How to Win Votes: The Politics of Nineteen Eighty (Harcourt 1980) .
 Edward N. Costikyan, What Happened To The Body Politic: Can it Be Restored? (Publish America 2005) .
 Edward N. Costikyan, Commentaries by Edward N. Costikyan: The Luck of the Draw and other essays (peachland books 2006) .

Articles

Oral history
 Oral History Interview with Edward N. Costikyan at Google Books

See also
 List of Armenian Americans
 List of Armenian American politicians

References

External links
 Index of collected papers at Columbia University libraries
 Memoriam page at Paul Weiss website
 Death notice at Legacy.com
 Memoriam page at ACTA website
 Listing at Martindale.com

1924 births
2012 deaths
Horace Mann School alumni
Columbia Law School alumni
New York (state) lawyers
New York (state) Democrats
American writers of Armenian descent
People from Harlem
Armenian male writers
American people of Swiss descent
Paul, Weiss, Rifkind, Wharton & Garrison people
20th-century American lawyers